Sasa is a rural village in the municipality of Makedonska Kamenica, North Macedonia. It is located on an average 1000 metres above  sea level.

History 
The village and surrounding mines were set up by Saxons, which settled north-eastern Macedonia in Middle Ages. The name Sasa originates from German Saxons, as Sasa is the traditional name for a Saxon in Macedonian.

Economy 
A major part of Sasa's economy is focused around the German-built lead and zinc mine, called Sasies. Constructed in the seventieth century, it has become a major lead and zinc extraction facility in the Balkans. The surrounding village is populated by around 1000 civilians; most are lower class and since the reopening of the mine in the 1960s, much of the male population has become miners.

Demographics
According to the 2002 census, the village had a total of 876 inhabitants. Ethnic groups in the village include:

Macedonians 874
Serbs 2

References

Villages in Makedonska Kamenica Municipality